This is a list of television programs formerly broadcast on TV Globo (formerly known as Rede Globo) in Brazil.

News

Newscasts 
 Amanhã (1975-1979)
 Globo em Dois Minutos (1970-1971)
 Globo Economia (1987-1989)
 Globo Notícia (2005–2014)
 Jornal da Noite (1974)
 Jornal das Sete (replaced by Praça TV; 1979-1983)
 Jornal de Verdade (1966-1969)
 Jornal Internacional (1972-1975)
 Jornal Nacional - 2ª Edição (1981-1982)
 Jornal da Semana (1966)
 Jornal de Vanguarda (1966)
 Jornalismo Eletrônico (1976-1978)
 São Paulo Já (SP Já) (1990-1996)
 Tele Globo (1965-1966)
 Telejornal Fluminense (1967-1968)
 Última Edição (1971-1972)
 Ultranotícias (1966-1967)

Other news programs 
 Agenda (1968-1966)
 Amaral Netto, o Repórter (1968-1983)
 Brasileiros (2010)
 A Cidade Contra o Crime (1966)
 Domingo Urgente (1967-1968)
 Fique por Dentro (1991-1995)
 Globo Revista (1981-1982)
 Globo Shell Especial (1971-1973)
 Ibrahim Sued Repórter (1966-1974)
 Linha Direta (1990; 1999-2007)
 Ordem do Dia (1968-1971)
 Painel (1977-1978)
 A Palavra é Sua (1987-1989)
 Plantão da Madrugada (1982-1983)
 O Povo e o Presidente (1982-1983)
 Show da Cidade (1966-1968)
 Terra de Nossa Gente (1965-1966)

 Children's programming 
 Angel Mix (1996-2000)
 As Aventuras de Eduardinho (1966-1968)
 Balão Mágico (1983-1986)
 Bambuluá (2000-2001)
 Capitão Furacão (1965-1970)
 Clube do Titio (1966-1968)
 Gente Inocente (2000-2002)
 Globinho (1972-1974; 1974-1982)
 Globo Cor Especial (1974-1984)
 Lilico & Cócegas (1969-1970)
 Minicarros (1974-1975)
 O Mundo Mágico de Alakazan (1965)
 Radical Chic (1993)
 Sandy & Junior (1999-2002)
 Show do Mallandro (1992-1993)
 Sítio do Picapau Amarelo  (1977-1986; 2001-2007; 2012-2014 Seasons 1 and 2 Only)
 A Turma do Didi (1998-2010)
 TV Colosso (1993-1997)
 Uni-Duni-Tê (1965-1968)
 Vila Sésamo (Brazilian version of Sesame Street, co-produced with TV Cultura; 1972-1977)
 Xou da Xuxa (first program hosted by Xuxa on Globo; 1986-1992)
  Bobeou Dançou (1989)
 Paradão da Xuxa (1992)
 Programa Xuxa (1993)
 Xuxa Park (1994-2001)
 Planeta Xuxa (1997-2002)
 Xuxa no Mundo da Imaginação (2002-2004)
 TV Xuxa (2005-2007)
 Conexão Xuxa (2007-2008)
 Zás Trás (1965-1970; 1972)
Dragon Ball (1987-1991, anime)
 Festival de Desenhos (1987–2015)
 Desenho Especial (1970-2018)A Turma do Didi (1998-2010)TV Globinho (2000-2015)

 Variety and talk shows 
 Réveillon do Faustão (yearly; 1991-1996)
 Som Brasil (1981–1989; 1993–1999; 2007–2013)Esquenta! (2011-2017)Muvuca (1998-2000)Ponto a Ponto (1996)Central da Periferia (2006)Estrelas (2006-2018)Adnight (2016-2017)Amor & Sexo (2009-2018)Não Fuja da Raia (1995; 1996)Jovens Tardes (2002-2004)Estação Globo (2004-2009)Por Toda Minha Vida (2006-2011)Sai do Chão (2014-2015)

 Comedy 
 Chico Total (:pt:Chico Total, 1981-1996)Faça humor, não faça guerra (pt:Faça Humor, Não Faça Guerra, 1970-1972)
 A Grande Família (1972–1975; 2001-2014)
 Os Trapalhões (1977-1995; 2017)Viva o Gordo (1981-1987)TV Pirata (1988-1990; 1992)Escolinha do Professor Raimundo (1990-1995; 2001; 2015-2020)Estados Anysios de Chico City (1991)Chico Anysio Show (1982-1990)Chico Total (1981; 1996)Doris para Maiores (1991)Vida ao Vivo Show (1998-1999)Zorra Total (1999-2015)Megatom (2000-2001)Sai de Baixo (1996-2002)Casseta & Planeta, Urgente! (1992-2010)Casseta & Planeta Vai Fundo (2012)A Diarista (2004-2007)Sob Nova Direção (2004-2007)Os Normais (2001-2003)Os Caras de Pau (2006-2013)Toma Lá, Dá Cá (2007-2009)Aventuras do Didi (2010-2012)Planeta dos Homens (1976--1982)
 Praça da Alegria (1957-1979)
 Sai de Baixo (1996-2002)Satiricom (pt:Satiricom, 1972-1975)

 International Series

 2020's 
 24 Horas: O Legado
A Million Little Things (Um Milhão de Coisas)
 
 Twisted: A Hora da Verdade (Twisted)
Killing Eve (Killing Eve: Dupla Obsessão)
Manifest (Manifest: O Mistério do Vôo 828)
 Não Há Segunda Chance (Une Chance de Trop / No Second Chance)
 The Mandalorian: Uma História de Guerra nas Estrelas (The Mandalorian)
 Coyote
 Magnum P.I. (2018)
 NCIS: Havaí - Investigações Criminais (NCIS: Hawaii)
 Barrados No Baile - Nova Geração (90210)
 The Equalizer: A Protetora (The Equalizer)
 A Ilha da Fantasia (2021) (Fantasy Island)
 La Brea: A Terra Perdida (La Brea) - exibição dos dois primeiros episódios da série em formato de telefilme
 This Is Us: Histórias de Família (This Is Us)
 Small Axe: Vermelho, Branco e Azul (Small Axe)
2010's 
 Hawaii 5-0 (2010)
 Mentes Criminosas (Criminal Minds)
 Crimes do Colarinho Branco (White Collar)
Revenge
 Under The Dome: Prisão Invisível
 Houdini
The Cleveland Show
 Terra do Nunca (Neverland)
 Raízes (2016) (Roots)
 O Gerente da Noite (The Night Manager)
 Guerra & Paz (2017)
The Flash (Flash)
Supergirl
Gotham
 Ressurreição (Ressurrection)
 Escândalos: Os Bastidores do Poder (Scandal)
 Empire: Fama e Poder (Empire)
 Segredos do Paraíso (Graceland)
 Lendas do Amanhã (DC's Legends of Tomorrow)
 Homeland: Segurança Nacional (Homeland)
Blindspot (Ponto Cego)
 Segredos e Mentiras (Secrets and Lies)
 Agentes Fora da Lei (Breakout Kings)
The Blacklist (Lista Negra)
Agent Carter (Agente Carter)
Castle
 Damages 
 Legends: Identidade Perdida (Legends)
 Rush: Medicina Vip (Rush)
 Tirano: Poder Sem Limites (Tyrant)
Marvel's Agents of S.H.I.E.L.D. (Agentes da S.H.I.E.L.D.)
 Perception: Truques da Mente
 Agenda Proibida (The Client List)
 Stalker: Obsessão (Stalker)
 Terra Nova 
 The Good Guys
 Prova do Crime (Body of Proof)
 Destino Final: Palm Glade (The Glades)
 Esquadrão de Heróis (The Super Hero Squad Show)
 Stan, O Cão Blogueiro
 Gravity Falls: Um Verão de Mistérios
 Kung Fu Panda: Lendas do Dragão Guerreiro
 Ultimate Homem-Aranha (Ultimate Spider-Man)
 Lições de um Crime (How To Get Away With Murder)
 Máquina Mortífera (2016) (Lethal Weapon)
 The Good Doctor: O Bom Doutor
 Jogo de Espiões
 Lista Negra (The Black List)
2000's 
 24 Horas (24)
 iCarly
 Drake & Josh
 Uma Família da Pesada
 Lost
 Hannah Montana
 Jonas
 American Dad!
 Glee
 Victorious
 Crimes no Paraíso
 Lie to Me
 Prison Break
1990's 
 The Flash
 Barrados no Baile (Beverly Hills 90210)
 Melrose (Melrose Place)
 Força de Emergência (True Blue)
 O Lobisomem Ataca de Novo (Werewolf)
 Herói por Acaso (My Secret Identity)
 Raio de Ação (Lightning Force)
 Um Homem Chamado Falcão (A Man Called Hawk)
 Models
 Tal Pai, Tal Filho (Doogie Howser MD)
 O Jovem Indiana Jones (Chronicles Of Young Indiana Jones)
 Justiça Final (Dark Justice)
 Twin Peaks
 Família Dinossauros (Dinosaurs)
 Baywatch: S.O.S. Malibu
 Nova York Contra o Crime (NYPD Blue)
 Justiceiros (The Hat Squad)
 Anjo Maldito (Gabriel´s Fire)
 Seaquest (Seaquest DSV)
 Brisco Jr. (The Adventures Of Brisco County Jr)
 Tudo em Cima (Ready Or Not)
 Sob O Sol De Miami (Moon Over Miami)
 Point de Verão (Tropical Heat/Sweating Bullets)
 Contra Ataque (Counterstrike)
 Thunder, Missão No Mar (Thunder In Paradise)
 Combate Mortal (Deadly Games)
 Gêmeos Do Outro Mundo (They Came From Other Space)
 Mulher Nota 1000 (Weird Science)
 O Elo Perdido (Land of the Lost)
 Justiça Final (Dark Justice)
 O Jovem Indiana Jones (The Young Indiana Jones Chronicles)
 Combate Mortal (Deadly Games)
 Raven
 Amazing Stories
 Angel
 Buffy, A Caça-Vampiros (Buffy, The Vampire Slayer)
 Lois & Clark: As Novas Aventuras do Superman (Lois and Clark: The New Adventures Of Superman)
 Plantão Médico (ER)
 Tudo Ou Nada (Baywatch Nights)
 Spin City
 Power Rangers
 VR Troopers
 Caiu do Céu (Touched By A Angel)
 Highlander
 Robin Hood (1995)
 Um Homem Sem Passado (Nowhere Man)
 Cobra (1993)
 Robocop
 As Aventuras de Sinbad (The Adventures of Sinbad)
 Fallen Angels: A Inocência Perdida
 Tremors: O Retorno dos Vermes Malditos
 Dawson's Creek
 Parceiros da Lei (Players)
 Os Simpsons
 M.A.N.T.I.S.: O Vingador (MANTIS)
 Nikita (La Femme Nikita)
 As Aventuras de Sinbad (The Adventures of Simbad)
 As Patricinhas de Beverly Hills (Clueless)
 Sabrina, Aprendiz de Feiticeira (Sabrina, The Teenage Witch)
 F/X: A Série (F/X: The Series)
 Dupla Explosiva (L.A. Heat)
1980's 
 Daniel Boone
 Jeannie é um Gênio (I Dream Of Jeannie)
 A Feiticeira (Bewitched)
 Kung Fu
 O Homem Invisível
 Viagem ao Fundo do Mar
 Mulher-Maravilha (1975) (Wonder Woman)
 Viagem Fantástica (Fantastic Voyage)
 Os Waltons (The Waltons)
 As Panteras (1976) (Charlie´s Angels)
 O Barco do Amor (The Love Boat)
 Happy Days (Happy Days/Happy Days Again)
 Vegas
 Galeria do Terror (Rod Serling´s Night Gallery)
 O Incrível Hulk (The Incredible Hulk)
 Àguia de Fogo (Airwolf)
 Carro Comando (T.J Hooker)
 Duro Na Queda (The Fall Guy)
 Faro Fino (Crazy Like A Fox)
 Deloucacia de Polícia (The Last Precinct)
 Unidade Especial
 MacGyver: Profissão Perigo
 Dama de Ouro (Lady Blue)
 Na Mira do Tira (Sledge Hammer!)
 Passe de Mágica (The Wizard)
 Casal 20 (Hart To Hart)
 Tempo Quente (Riptide)
 Curto Circuito (Misfits Of Science)
 Fuga Maluca (Stir Crazy)
 Deloucacia de Polícia (The Last Precinct)
 Alf, O ET Teimoso (ALF)
 O Pequeno Mestre (Sidekicks)
 A Gata E O Rato (Moonlightning)
 Magnum
 Operação Resgate (Salvage 1)
 Esquadrão Resgate (Chopper Squad)
 Cara e Coroa (Hardcastle and McCormick)
 Jogo de Damas (Partners In Crime/Fifty Fifty)
 O Homem De Seis Milhões De Dólares (The Six Million Dollar Man)
 Os Intocáveis (1963) (The Untouchables)
 Pais Demais (My Two Dads)
 Boca Livre (Easy Street)
 Três É Demais (Full House)
 O Homem Da Máfia (Wiseguy)
 Tiro Certo (Hunter)
 Dallas
 Dinastia (Dynasty)
 Moto Laser (Street Hawk)
 Caras e Caretas (Family Ties)
 O Poderoso Benson (Benson)
 Super Gatas (Golden Girls)
 Super Vicky (Small Wonder)
 Primo Cruzado (Perfect Strangers)
 O Carona
 Anjos da Lei (21 Jump Street)
 A Bela e a Fera (1987) (Beauty And The Beast)
 Esquadrão Classe A (The A Team)
 Suspense (com Alfred Hitchcock) (Alfred Hitchcock Presents)
 Força de Emergência (True Blue)
 Pega Ladrão (Palace Guard)
 Enfermeiras (Nightingales)
 Ghost, A Série (Shades Of L.A)
 Um Homem Chamado Falcão (A Man Called Hawk)
 Miami Vice

 
 
 
 
 
 
 
 
 
 
 
 
 
 
 
 
 
 
 
 
 
 
 
 
 
 
 
 
 
 
 
 
 
 
 
 
 
 
 
 
 
 
 
 
 
 
 
 
 
 
 
 
 
 
 
 
 
 
 
 
 
 
 
 

Reality shows/Game shows
 Big Brother Brasil The Voice Brasil The Voice Kids The Voice + Quem Quer Ser um Milionário? (Who Wants to Be a Millionaire?) - (Domingão com Huck) Show dos Famosos (Your Face Sounds Familiar) Dança dos Famosos (Dancing with the Stars) The Masked Singer Brasil (Masked Singer) No Limite (Survivor) Tem Ou Não Tem (Family Feud) - (Caldeirão) Acredite Em Quem Quiser (To Tell the Truth) - (Domingão com Huck) Batalha de Família (Family Game Fight!) - (Pipoca da Ivete) Batalha do Lip Sync (Lip Sync Battle) - (Domingão com Huck) Zig Zag Arena (Game Show) Mestre do Sabor Mystery Duets Brasil (Mystery Duets) - (Domingão com Huck) Pequenos Gênios (Genius Junior) - (Caldeirão do Huck) - (2020) Tá Brincando (Pros vs. Joes) - (2019) Ding Dong (Superstar Ding Dong) - (Domingão do Faustão) Se vira nos 30 (30 Seconds to Fame) - (Domingão do Faustão) Popstar The Wall - (Caldeirão do Huck) - (2018) SuperStar (Rising Star) (2014-2016) Saltibum (Celebrity Splash!) - (Caldeirão do Huck) Chefe Secreto (Undercover Boss) - (Fantástico) Dança no Gelo (Skating with Celebrities / Dancing on Ice) - (Domingão do Faustão) Agora ou Nunca - (Caldeirão do Huck) Garotada & Cachorrada (reality show about children training dogs) (2016) - (Domingão do Faustão) Os Iluminados (Keep Your Light Shining) (2015-2016) - (Domingão do Faustão) Truque Vip (reality show about magical tricks and illusionism with celebrities) (2015-2016) - (Domingão do Faustão) The Ultimate Fighter: Brazil (The Ultimate Fighter) (2012-2015) Tem gente atrás (Avanti un altro!) (2013-2014) - (Domingão do Faustão) Ruim de Roda (Worst Driver) (2012) - (Caldeirão do Huck) Jogo de Panelas (Come Dine with Me) (2012) - (Mais Você) Os Encolhidos (XXS – Extra Extra Small) (2010-2011) - (Domingão do Faustão) Sufoco (The Whole 19 Yards) (2010) - (Domingão do Faustão) Hipertensão (Fear Factor) (2002-2011) Maratoma (Wipeout) (2009) - (Domingão do Faustão) No Limite (Survivor) (2000-2009) Jogo Duro (Estate of Panic) (2009) Super Chefinhos (2009-2016) - (Mais Você) Super Chef (2008-2011) - (Mais Você) De Cara no Muro (Brain Wall) (2008-2010) - (Domingão do Faustão) Jogo dos 10 (Power of 10) (2008) - (Domingão do Faustão) Dancinha dos Famosos (Dancing with the Stars Kids) (2007-2017) - (Domingão do Faustão) Circo do Faustão (Celebrity Circus) (2007) - (Domingão do Faustão) Soletrando (2007-2015) - (Caldeirão do Huck) Pulsação (2005-2015) - (Caldeirão do Huck) TV Xuxa (2008-2014) O Jogo (Murder in Small Town X) (2003) FAMA (Star Academy) (2002-2005) Acorrentados (Chains of Love) (2002-2004) - (Caldeirão do Huck) Amor a Bordo (2002) - (Caldeirão do Huck) Guerra dos Sonos (Exhausted) (2002) - (Caldeirão do Huck) Video Game (2001-2011) Jogo da Velha (Celebrity Squares) (1989-1993-2015) - (Domingão do Faustão) Ponto Fraco (The Weakest Link) (2001) (Cancelled) Jogo da Velha (Match Game) (1989-1993) Movie blocks 
 Cine Fã-Clube (2014–2015)
 Sessão Brasil (2007-2014)
 Sessão Aventura (1977-2001)
 Sessão Comédia (1976-1990 - when Teletema returned; 1991-1996)
 Sessão de Sábado (1992-2011)
 Sessão de Domingo (1970-1989)
 Sessão de Gala (1976-2019)
 Festival de Sucessos (1977–1996; 2008–2014; 2019, for 4 weeks in an exceptional basis)
 Festival Nacional (1981-1990; 1998-2014)
 Festival Primavera (1990-1998)
 Festival de Inverno (1978-1998)
 Festival de Verão (1978-1996)
 Festival de Férias (1977-2000)
 Festival Rexona de Cinema (2019)
 Sessão Brasil (2007-2014)
 Cine Clube (1984-1996)
 Primeira Exibição (1974-1995)
 Cinema Em Casa (1970-1980)
 Semana da Primavera (1986-1989)
 Sessão Das Dez (1965-1970)
 Sessão Da Meia Noite (1965-1970)
 Festival De Clássicos (1965-1970)
 Festival De Bang Bang (1965-1970)
 Sessão Western (1970-1990)
 Sessão Cowboy (1970-1990)
 Sessão Coruja (1965-1975)
 Coruja Colorida (1975-1985)
 Intercine (1996-2010)
 Intercine Brasil'' (2004-2007)

See also 
 List of programs broadcast by TV Globo

References 

Former
Lists of television series by network